Seyyed Kheyl (also Romanized as Seyyed Khīl) is a village in Zarem Rud Rural District, Hezarjarib District, Neka County, Mazandaran Province, Iran. At the 2006 census, its population was 145, in 41 families.

References 

Populated places in Neka County